Ayala North Point, formerly part of the Lacson Estate, is a flagship estate development project of Ayala Land located in Talisay, Negros Occidental. Acquired from the heirs of Gen. Aniceto Lacson, former president of the Republic of Negros, Ayala North Point follows the master-planned, mixed-use residential township estate first conceptualized with Ayala Alabang.

Residential
Ayala Land subsidiaries like Ayala Premier, Alveo, Avida and Amaia Land all have existing residential concept projects in the estate. Ayala Premier is the pioneer developer, which placed Ayala North Point in the prime use map in the Visayas.

Commercial
The District, Ayala Malls' mid-level mall development, opened doors on May 8, 2013 as a community center, catering to the local residents and shoppers from neighboring Bacolod and Silay. It includes a gross lease area of an initial 26,725 sq.m., which excludes the anchor supermarket, Metro Gaisano, adjacent to an earlier-built BPO facility.

References

Mixed-use developments in the Philippines
Shopping districts and streets in the Philippines
Buildings and structures in Negros Occidental